Ricotta forte (strong ricotta) is a very traditional soft cheese of Basilicata and Apulia, in southeastern Italy. It is creamy, spicy and slightly bitter.

Its preparation is similar to the Greek cheese called kopanisti: the milk is fermented by bacteria and yeast which contribute to the spicy taste and to the very intense aroma. The aroma is similar to the long-seasoned pecorino.

This cheese is typically used on pasta to make the tomato sauce tastier or on the bread with anchovies or in the traditional fried panzerotti.

It has been recognised by the Ministry of Agricultural, Food and Forestry Policies as a Lucanian and Apulian traditional food product (PAT Prodotto agroalimentare tradizionale).

References 

Italian cheeses
Lucanian cheeses
Cuisine of Apulia